Respiratory Care is a monthly peer-reviewed medical journal published by the American Association of Respiratory Care. It is abstracted and indexed in Index Medicus/PubMed and the Science Citation Index Expanded. The editor-in-chief is Dean R. Hess (Massachusetts General Hospital and Harvard Medical School). The journal publishes original research, reviews (narrative and systematic), short reports, correspondence, and editorial articles. It was established in 1956 as Inhalation Therapy and obtained its current title in 1970. According to the Journal Citation Reports, the journal has a 2020 impact factor of 2.258.

See also
List of medical journals
List of healthcare journals

References

External links

Pulmonology journals
Monthly journals
Publications established in 1956
English-language journals